The 1935 New Year Honours in New Zealand were appointments by King George V to various orders and honours to reward and highlight good works by New Zealanders. The awards celebrated the passing of 1934 and the beginning of 1935, and were announced on 1 January 1935.

The recipients of honours are displayed here as they were styled before their new honour.

Knight Bachelor
 Clutha Nantes Mackenzie – director of the Institute for the Blind, Auckland.
 Percy Rolfe Sargood – of Dunedin. For public services.

Order of Saint Michael and Saint George

Companion (CMG)
 George Arthur Lewin – town clerk of the City of Dunedin.
 Herbert Harry Sterling – chairman, Government Railway Board.

Order of the British Empire

Officer (OBE)
Military division
 Paymaster Commander Richard Francis Durman  – naval secretary of the New Zealand Naval Board.

References

New Year Honours
1935 awards
1935 in New Zealand
New Zealand awards